The Yakima Area Arboretum (46 acres) is an arboretum in Yakima, Washington on a site adjoining the riparian habitat of the Yakima River.

In the 19th century, today's site was a wetland. It was later developed for chicken and vegetable farms, and eventually acquired by the Yakima Metro District. In 1967, the arboretum was established and initial work began. Development has continued ever since.

The arboretum currently includes over 1,000 native and exotic species of woody plants, as well as a herbarium and a variety of gardens (butterfly, rose, iris, Japanese, perennial, dryland, and Xeriscape.

See also
 List of botanical gardens in the United States
 Map: 

Arboreta in Washington (state)
Botanical gardens in Washington (state)
Yakima, Washington
Protected areas of Yakima County, Washington
Yakima River